Retinaculum may refer to:

In vertebrate anatomy:
Retinaculum,a band around tendons that holds them in place. 
 Extensor retinaculum of the hand
 Flexor retinaculum of the hand
 Flexor retinaculum of foot
 Inferior extensor retinaculum of foot
 Lateral retinaculum
 Medial patellar retinaculum
 Peroneal retinacula
 Retinaculum cutis mammae, Latin name for connective breast tissue
 Superior extensor retinaculum of foot

In invertebrate anatomy:
 the retinaculum, in wing
 the Retinaculum (springtail), in springtail abdomen
 Buffetia retinaculum, a species of air-breathing land snail